Christian Ezike (born 30 July 1999), also known as Kristian Ezike, is a Nigerian footballer who currently plays as a forward for KF Elbasani.

Career statistics

Club

Notes

References

1999 births
Living people
Nigerian footballers
Nigerian expatriate footballers
Association football forwards
Kategoria e Parë players
FK Jagodina players
Nigerian expatriate sportspeople in Albania
Expatriate footballers in Albania
Sportspeople from Lagos
21st-century Nigerian people